Pierino contro tutti (also known as Desirable Teacher) is a 1981 comedy film directed by Marino Girolami. The main character of the film is Pierino, an Italian variation of Little Johnny. The film was a massive success at the Italian box office, and generated a brief series of sequels (in the main part non-official sequels) including a female version of Pierino, as well as a short lived subgenre of joke-films in which the plot basically consists of a series of jokes placed side by side.

Plot 
Rome: Peter (Pierino) is a precocious but mischievous boy who often plays pranks and makes jokes at school. His enemy is his old teacher. One day Pierino pulls a dirty trick on her, making her break an arm. The substitute class teacher is a pretty girl Pierino falls in love with. However, a professor also falls in love with the beautiful teacher, and so Pierino must devise numerous jokes to save the teacher.

Cast 
Alvaro Vitali: Pierino
Michela Miti: Substitute
Sophia Lombardo: Teacher Mazzacurati
Michele Gammino: Teacher Celani
Enzo Liberti:   Pierino's father
Riccardo Billi:   Pierino's grandfather
Deddi Savagnone: Pierino's mother
Cristina Moffa: Sabrina, Pierino's sister
Marisa Merlini: Fortune teller
Enzo Garinei:  Hardware Store Customer

References

External links

1981 films
Italian comedy films
1981 comedy films
Films directed by Marino Girolami
Films scored by Berto Pisano
1980s Italian-language films
1980s Italian films